Seven Veils (1998) is an album by the U.S. ambient musician Robert Rich. It is inspired by Arab culture and music. This album has a heightened emphasis on rhythms, from guitar and percussion. All pieces except track 3 were composed in just intonation. Guests include David Torn on guitar and Hans Christian on cello. Ranked by Allmusic as one of Rich's best albums, it was praised as, "This Muslim psychedelia is a must for every shrinking world audiophile."

Track listing
 "Coils" – 6:03
 "Alhambra" – 10:09
 "Talisman of Touch" – 4:52
 "Book of Ecstasy" – 15:03
 "A Silken Thread" – 5:07
 "A Hungry Moon" – 4:00
 "A Veiled Oasis" – 5:56
 "Ibn Sina" – 8:33
 "Dissolve" – 5:34
 "Lapis" – 10:19

All compositions by Robert Rich. Titles: 2 refers to the Alhambra, 5 to Ibn Sina, and 6 to Lapis.

Personnel
Musical
Robert Rich – synthesizers, samplers, drums & percussion, bamboo and PVC flutes, lap steel guitar, rubberband marimba, dulcimer, waterphone, "glurp"
 with
David Torn – guitar (tracks 2 and 4)
Andrew McGowan – bass (track 2)
Forrest Fang – violin (track 3)
Hans Christian – cello (track 4 and 7)
Mark Forry – Balkan kaval (track 6)

Technical
 Recording, mixing: Robert Rich
 Mastering: Bob Olhsson, Robert Rich

Graphical
 Cover photo: Robert Holmes (Sausalito)
 Artist photo: Brad Cole
 Art direction: Stephen Hill
 Design: Stephen Hill, Jeremy Hulette

References

Sources
 Allmusic. [ "Seven Veils"]
 Rich, Robert (1998). "CD liner notes" in Seven Veils, San Francisco: Hearts of Space Records, August 18, 1998, SKU HS11086, EAN 0025041108621 (UPC 025041108621)

External links
 
 Seven Veils at Hearts of Space Records

Robert Rich (musician) albums
1998 albums
Hearts of Space Records albums